The white-cheeked blenny (Acanthemblemaria johnsoni) is a species of chaenopsid blenny found in coral reefs around Tobago, in the western central Atlantic ocean. The specific name honours the ichthyologist G. David Johnson Curator of the Division of Fishes at the Smithsonian Institution.

References

johnsoni
Fish of Trinidad and Tobago
white-cheeked blenny